The 1991 Campeonato Brasileiro Série A was the 35th edition of the Campeonato Brasileiro Série A. The competition was won by São Paulo. Santos Futebol Clube's Paulinho McLaren, with 15 goals, was the competition's top goal scorer.

Overview
It was contested by 20 teams, and São Paulo won the championship. 20 teams played against each other once in the first stage. The four best-placed teams qualified to the semi-finals, played in two legs. The semi-final winners qualified to the final, played in two legs.

Standings

First stage

Playoffs

The final

São Paulo: Zetti; Cafu, Antônio Carlos, Ricardo Rocha and Leonardo; Ronaldão, Bernardo and Raí; Müller, Macedo and Elivélton (Mário Tilico). Head coach: Telê Santana.

Bragantino: Marcelo; Gil Baiano, Júnior, Nei and Biro-Biro; Mauro Silva, Alberto and Mazinho Oliveira; Ivair (Luís Müller), Sílvio and Ronaldo Alfredo (Franklin). Head coach: Carlos Alberto Parreira.

Bragantino: Marcelo; Gil Baiano, Júnior, Nei and Biro-Biro; Mauro Silva, Alberto and Mazinho Oliveira; Ivair (Luís Müller), Sílvio and João Santos (Franklin). Head coach: Carlos Alberto Parreira.

São Paulo: Zetti; Zé Teodoro, Antônio Carlos, Ricardo Rocha and Leonardo; Ronaldão, Bernardo, Cafu and Raí; Macedo and Müller (Flávio). Head coach: Telê Santana.

Final standings

References

External links
 Campeonato Brasileiro Série A 1991 at RSSSF

1991
1